Vanarasena is a 1996 Indian Malayalam film, directed by Jayan Varkala. The film stars Jagathy Sreekumar, Baiju, Anju Aravind and Augustine in lead roles. The film had musical score by Berny-Ignatius.

Plot
Vanarasena is a story of two sibling astrologers in a village, who constantly argue with each other ended up splitting for trivial reasons.

Cast

Jagathy Sreekumar as Pankajakshan
Baiju as Ulpalakshan/Joykutty
K. T. S. Padannayil as Vadakkekara Kanaran Karanavar
Philomina as Vadakkedathu Narayani
Bahadoor as Lambodharan, Narayani's Husband
Usharani as Vishalakshi, Kanaran's Wife
Augustine as Vaidyar
Sudheesh as Manikandan, Kanaran's Son
Anju Aravind as Ambika, Narayani's Elder Daughter
Vettukkili Prakash as Achuthan, Narayani's Son
Kunjandi as Tea Shop Owner
Narayanankutty as Romeo Bhaskaran
Kavitha Thampi as Thankamani, Kanaran's Daughter

Soundtrack
The music was composed by Berny-Ignatius and the lyrics were written by Gireesh Puthenchery.

References

External links
 

1996 films
1990s Malayalam-language films
Films scored by Berny–Ignatius